Daniel Fischer may refer to:

 Daniel Fischer (footballer) (born 1997), Austrian footballer
 Daniel Fischer (politician) (born 1952), from Wisconsin
 Daniel Fischer, presenter of the German version of Runaround
 Daniel Fischer of Fischer Motor Company

See also
 Daniel Fisher (disambiguation)